Aline Silva Pereira (born 1990) is a Brazilian mixed martial artist and former kickboxer, currently competing in the flyweight division of LFA. She is a one-time Glory Super Bantamweight title challenger, having fought Tiffany van Soest for it in 2021.

Personal life
Pereira is indigenous Brazilian, being of the Pataxó tribe. Pereira's older brother, Alex Pereira, is the current UFC Middleweight Champion and a former two-division Glory kickboxing champion.

Kickboxing career

Early career
Pereira made her professional debut against Rayane Vieira at WGP Kickboxing 39 on July 22, 2017. She won the fight by unanimous decision. Pereira was afterwards scheduled to face Mayza Borges at WGP Kickboxing 44 on February 23, 2018, and was once again won by unanimous decision. Pererira's two-fight winning streak was stopped by Elaine Lopes, who beat her by unanimous decision at WGP Kickboxing 45 on May 5, 2018.

Pereira was scheduled to face Tatiana Campos at WGP Kickboxing 50 on October 27, 2018. She won the fight by unanimous decision. Pereira was then scheduled to face Nilcelia Pereira at Super Fighters 4 on June 8, 2019. She won the fight by unanimous decision. Following this victory, Pereira was signed by Glory.

Glory
Pereira made her promotional debut with Glory against Chommanee Sor Taehiran at Glory 68: Miami on September 28, 2019. She won the fight by unanimous decision.

Pereira was scheduled to face Crystal Lawson at Glory 71: Chicago on November 22, 2019. She won the fight by a first-round technical knockout, which was the first stoppage victory in her professional career.

Pereira challenged Tiffany van Soest for the Glory Super Bantamweight Championship at Glory 77: Rotterdam on January 30, 2021. Pereira lost the fight by unanimous decision.

Mixed martial arts career

LFA
Pereira was scheduled to make her mixed martial arts debut against Helen Peralta at Legacy Fighting Alliance 147: Melo vs. Costa on November 18, 2022. Pereira lost the fight by unanimous decision.

Kickboxing record

|-  style="text-align:center; background:#fbb;"
| 2021-01-30 || Loss || align=left| Tiffany van Soest || Glory 77: Rotterdam || Rotterdam, Netherlands || Decision (Unanimous) || 5 || 3:00
|-
! style=background:white colspan=9 |
|-
|-  style="text-align:center; background:#cfc;"
| 2019-11-22 || Win || align=left| Crystal Lawson || Glory 71: Chicago || Chicago, United States || TKO (3 Knockdown Rule) || 1 || 0:59
|-
|-  style="text-align:center; background:#cfc;"
| 2019-09-28 || Win || align=left| Chommanee Sor Taehiran || Glory 68: Miami || Miami, United States || Decision (Unanimous) || 3 || 3:00
|-
|-  style="text-align:center; background:#cfc;"
| 2019-06-08 || Win || align=left| Nilcelia Pereira || Super Fighters 4 || South Zone of São Paulo, Brazil || Decision (Unanimous) || 3 || 3:00
|-
|-  style="text-align:center; background:#cfc;"
| 2018-10-27 || Win || align=left| Tatiana Campos || WGP Kickboxing 50 || São Bernardo do Campo, Brazil || Decision (Unanimous) || 3 || 3:00
|-
|-  style="text-align:center; background:#fbb;"
| 2018-05-05 || Loss || align=left| Elaine Lopes || WGP Kickboxing 45, Tournament Semifinal || Sorocaba, Brazil || Decision (Unanimous) || 3 || 3:00
|-
|-  style="text-align:center; background:#cfc;"
| 2018-02-23 || Win || align=left| Mayza Borges || WGP Kickboxing 44 || São Bernardo do Campo, Brazil || Decision (Unanimous) || 3 || 3:00
|-
|-  style="text-align:center; background:#cfc;"
| 2017-07-22 || Win || align=left| Rayane Vieira || WGP Kickboxing 39 || Vitória, Espírito Santo, Brazil || Decision (Unanimous) || 3 || 3:00
|-
| colspan=9 | Legend:

Mixed martial arts record 

|-
|Loss
|align=center| 0–1
|Helen Peralta
|Decision (unanimous)
|LFA 147
|
|align=center|3
|align=center|5:00
|Sloan, Iowa, United States 
|

See also
 List of female kickboxers

References

1990 births
Brazilian female kickboxers
Glory kickboxers
Living people
People from São Bernardo do Campo
Bantamweight kickboxers
Brazilian female mixed martial artists
Bantamweight mixed martial artists
Mixed martial artists utilizing kickboxing
Sportspeople from São Paulo (state)
21st-century Brazilian women